A V18 engine is an eighteen-cylinder piston engine where two banks of nine cylinders are arranged in a V configuration around a common crankshaft.

The V18 engine is a rare configuration and is primarily used in large diesel engines running at low operating speeds. These large V18 diesel engines have seen limited use in haul trucks, electricity generation, rail transport, and marine propulsion. 

There are no known automobiles that have used V18 engines and no engine manufacturer has developed or produced a V18 engine for use in automobiles.

While the V18 is a more uncommon engine configuration, there are more common eighteen-cylinder engine configurations such as the W18, which has seen use in both automobiles and aircraft, and the Deltic, an opposed-piston eighteen-cylinder diesel engine created by D. Napier & Son which was used for a variety of applications.

Examples 

The BelAZ 75600 and Liebherr T 282B haul trucks are powered by the Cummins QSK78 engine, while the Komatsu 960E-1 haul truck is powered by the Komatsu SSDA18V170 engine.

In 1971, the Canadian locomotive manufacturer MLW-Worthington produced the MLW M640 prototype diesel-electric locomotive powered by a ALCO 18-251 engine, however the locomotive did not reach production.

See also 
 W18 engine

References 

 
Piston engine configurations
18